Kuwanon G is an antimicrobial bombesin receptor antagonist, isolated from Morus alba.

External links
Kuwanon G: an antibacterial agent from the root bark of Morus alba against oral pathogens
Non-peptide bombesin receptor antagonists, kuwanon G and H, isolated from mulberry

Phenols
Cyclohexenes
Chromones
Resorcinols